The 12th Vanier Cup was played on November 19, 1976, at Varsity Stadium in Toronto, Ontario, and decided the CIAU football champion for the 1976 season. The Western Ontario Mustangs (of the University of Western Ontario) won their third championship by defeating the Acadia Axemen (of Nova Scotia's Acadia University) by a score of 29 to 13.

References

External links
 Official website

Vanier Cup
Vanier Cup
1976 in Toronto
November 1976 sports events in Canada